Anderson da Silva (born on February 2, 1980) is a Brazilian footballer (midfielder) last played  for Persiram Raja Ampat.

References

External links

Anderson da Silva at HKFA

1980 births
Living people
Association football midfielders
Expatriate footballers in Argentina
Expatriate footballers in Hong Kong
Expatriate footballers in Indonesia
Expatriate footballers in Mexico
Liga 1 (Indonesia) players
Brazilian expatriate footballers
Brazilian footballers
Toros Neza footballers